Nemolizumab is an experimental drug for the treatment of itching in people with atopic dermatitis. It is a monoclonal antibody that blocks the interleukin-31 receptor A. Results of a Phase II clinical trial were published in March 2017.

Nemolizumab was invented by Chugai, who sold an exclusive license for the drug's development and worldwide marketing (except Japan and Taiwan) to Galderma in 2016.

References 

Monoclonal antibodies
Immunosuppressants